Walter Reeves (September 25, 1848 – April 9, 1909) was a U.S. Representative from Illinois.

Biography
Walter Reeves was born near Brownsville, Pennsylvania on September 25, 1948. He moved with his parents to Illinois in 1856, where they settled upon a farm in La Salle County.

He attended the public schools, and later taught school while studying law. He was admitted to the bar in Mount Vernon, Illinois, in 1875, and commenced practice in Streator, Illinois.

Reeves was elected as a Republican to the Fifty-fourth and to the three succeeding Congresses (March 4, 1895 – March 3, 1903).
He served as chairman of the Committee on Patents (Fifty-seventh Congress).
He was not a candidate for renomination in 1902.
He was an unsuccessful candidate for the Republican nomination for governor in 1900.
He resumed the practice of law.

He died at his home in Streator, Illinois on April 9, 1909, and was interred in Riverview Cemetery.

References

1848 births
1909 deaths
People from Streator, Illinois
Republican Party members of the United States House of Representatives from Illinois
19th-century American politicians
People from Mount Vernon, Illinois
People from Fayette County, Pennsylvania